Secrets and Lies is an American mystery anthology television series that aired on ABC from March 1, 2015 to December 4, 2016. The series is based on the Australian television series of the same name, and developed for American television by Barbie Kligman.

The series follows Detective Andrea Cornell (Juliette Lewis) of the fictional Charlotte-Mecklenburg County Police Department as she investigates homicide cases. In the first season, Ben Crawford (Ryan Phillippe) becomes the prime suspect in the death of a young boy who lived in his neighborhood. In the second season, Cornell investigates Eric Warner (Michael Ealy), a newly married heir to his family's private equity firm, when his wife Kate is murdered.
 
The series was renewed for a second season on May 7, 2015, which premiered on September 25, 2016 and concluded on December 4, 2016. On May 11, 2017, ABC cancelled the series after two seasons.

Plot summary

Season one
Ben Crawford is a self-employed contractor, married to Christy with whom he has two daughters, Natalie, 16, and Abby, 12. His best friend, Dave, lives in their summer house. They have a neighbor, Jess, who is estranged from her husband Scott, who is in the military. Jess and Scott have a five-year-old son named Tom.

While out for an early morning run, Ben discovers Tom's body; he was evidently taken from his bed into the woods and killed by six blows to the head from a flashlight. 

Detective Cornell is convinced Ben is the killer, Ben cannot prove his innocence because he suffered a blackout after going out drinking with Dave following a fight with Christy over her suspicion of an affair with Jess. 

The Crawfords suffer media intrusion and are shunned by the community; a misunderstanding leads to a falling-out with Dave. They learn that Tom was in fact Ben's son, the result of a one-night affair, only revealed to him after DNA tests by police. 

Ben conducts his own investigations, leading to false accusations against Scott and other neighbors. He is manipulated by a reporter, Arthur, who is looking to take down Cornell, and kidnapped by a neighbor, Kevin, a former CIA operative, who attempts to extract a confession through torture. 

The rift with Dave is repaired only after Dave confesses to spiking Ben's drink the night of the murder. Together they retrace Ben's steps. Cornell begins to consider other suspects.

By this time Ben's marriage has fallen apart. After sleeping with Jess once more, Ben discovers she is bipolar; convinced she is the killer and wrongly assuming she has now kidnapped Abby, she counters that with a false accusation of rape. 

Independently of each other, Cornell and Ben discover the awful truth that Tom was killed by Abby. She confesses to her family that it was an accident, a failed plan to hide Tom for a short while to make it appear he was missing, to induce Scott to come home and prevent her father leaving Christy for Jess. 

Ben decides to confess to the murder to protect Abby, despite the protestations of Cornell, who is convinced Abby will kill again and vows to put her away. Abby reveals her plan all along had been to drown Tom, in the hope it would make Jess move away.

In Season two, Ben is revealed to have been killed in jail. However, his innocence came to light afterwards. These facts have apparently put a stain on Cornell's reputation as a detective. It is unknown as of yet whether or not Abby was revealed to be Tom's real killer or if she succeeded in evading justice.

Season two
Eric Warner (Michael Ealy), a newly married heir to his family's private equity firm, is under suspicion from Detective Cornell when his wife Kate (Jordana Brewster) is murdered.

Cast and characters

Main 
Season 1
 Ryan Phillippe as Ben Crawford
 Juliette Lewis as Detective Andrea Cornell
 KaDee Strickland as Christine "Christy" Crawford
 Natalie Martinez as Jessica "Jess" Murphy 
 Dan Fogler as Dave Lindsey
 Indiana Evans as Natalie Crawford
 Belle Shouse as Abby Crawford

Season 2
Michael Ealy as Eric Warner
 Juliette Lewis as Detective Andrea Cornell
 Jordana Brewster as Kate Warner
 Mekia Cox as Amanda Warner
 Charlie Barnett as Patrick Warner
 Kenny Johnson as Danny
Terry O'Quinn as John Warner

Recurring
Season 1
 Michael Beach as Arthur Fenton
 Steven Brand as Joseph Richardson
 Kate Ashfield as Vanessa Richardson
 Benny Ciaramello as Scott Murphy
 Greg Alan Williams as Kevin Haynes
 Denise Dowse as Elaine Williams
 Meaghan Rath as Nicole Mullen 
 Melissa Gilbert as Lisa Daly

Season 2
 AnnaLynne McCord as Melanie Warner
 Eric Winter as Neil Oliver
 McNally Sagal as May Stone
 David James Elliott as Mayor Bryant
 Brendan Hines as Detective Ralston
 Edwin Hodge as Dr. Greg Young

Production
Secrets and Lies was given its initial 10-episode series commitment in October 2013. Barbie Kligman was brought in as executive producer and showrunner while the producers from the original series, Tracey Robertson and Nathan Mayfield, serve as executive producers. On May 9, 2014, Secrets and Lies was picked up by ABC to air as a mid-season entry during the 2014–15 season.

An additional scene from the season 1 finale was made available online, set 14 months after the rest of the episode, with Natalie clearing Ben's name.

Series overview

Episodes
Cornell: Confidential is a web series by ABC Studios and Disney/ABC Digital Media Studios which accompanies the television series. Each webisode was released online after the television episode aired and gives additional clues told from the perspective of Detective Cornell.

Season 1 (2015)

Season 2 (2016)

Reception

Ratings

Season 1 (2015)

Season 2 (2016)

Critical reception
Secrets and Lies has received mixed criticism when season one came out. On Rotten Tomatoes, it received a 36% approval rating, with a rating average of 4.7/10, based on 30 reviews. Its critical consensus reads: "While some may find its limited intrigue compelling, Secrets and Lies is ultimately undone by wooden performances, excessive red herrings, and bad scripts." On Metacritic, it scored 48 out of 100, based on 22 "mixed or average" reviews.

Controversy
On March 16, 2015, ABC and the show's producers came under fire from the bleeding disorder community for portraying hemophilia as an incestuous disease with Michael Beach's character stating: "Hemophilia is the nasty byproduct of incest." A petition for a public apology was started on Change.org. In subsequent airings of the episode, the line was removed, but ABC published no formal apology.

International broadcast
 The series premiered in Germany on Universal TV on March 10, 2015. The second season aired from June 20 to August 22, 2016.
 The series premiered in India on Zee Café on April 11, 2015.
 The series premiered in France on M6 on November 5, 2015.
 The series premiered in Turkey on Dizimax Drama.
 The series premiered in Brazil on Globo on October 17, 2016.
 The series premiered in Italy on Rai 4 on September 13, 2015.
 The series premiered in Finland on 13th Street on June 1, 2015.

References

External links

2010s American drama television series
2015 American television series debuts
2016 American television series endings
American Broadcasting Company original programming
English-language television shows
2010s American mystery television series
American television series based on Australian television series
Television series by ABC Studios
Television shows filmed in North Carolina
Television shows filmed in Wilmington, North Carolina
Television shows featuring audio description
Fiction about interracial romance
Television series by Kapital Entertainment